Daun Sessoms Hester (born October 7, 1955) is an American politician and educator. She served on the nonpartisan Norfolk, Virginia City Council 1996–2010, and was vice mayor 2004–08.

Early life, education, family
Hester was born in Norfolk and grew up in the Five Points neighborhood, graduating from Norview High School. She received a Bachelor of Science degree in education from Virginia State University in 1978 and a Master of Arts in education and human development from George Washington University in 1990.

Hester worked for Norfolk Public Schools for 22 years.

Electoral history

Political career
Hester was first elected to Norfolk City Council in 1996, representing Superward 7. In 2004, she was chosen as vice mayor by her fellow council members, holding that position until 2008. In 2010, she ran for mayor against the incumbent, Paul D. Fraim, and two other challengers, losing to Fraim, 64% to 30%. After losing the election, she resigned her council seat.

State Senator Yvonne B. Miller died in July 2012, creating an opening in the 5th Senate district. Delegate Kenneth Cooper Alexander won her seat in a September 4 special election, creating another vacancy in the 89th House district. Hester defeated Yvonne Allmond, a banker, 840–290 in a Democratic party firehouse primary on October 17. Hester then defeated James J. St. John, an independent, in the special election on December 18.

Notes

External links
 (Constituent/campaign website)

1955 births
Living people
Democratic Party members of the Virginia House of Delegates
Virginia city council members
Women state legislators in Virginia
African-American state legislators in Virginia
African-American women in politics
Virginia State University alumni
George Washington University Graduate School of Education and Human Development alumni
Politicians from Norfolk, Virginia
Women city councillors in Virginia
21st-century American politicians
21st-century American women politicians
African-American city council members